Naomi Seibt (born 18 August 2000) is a German political activist, known as a climate change denier and for her opposition to climate activist Greta Thunberg. Until April 2020, she was employed by the Heartland Institute, an American conservative and right-wing public policy think tank that marketed her as the "anti-Greta". She has spoken at multiple events organized by conservative think tanks and has self-identified as a libertarian and an anarcho-capitalist. Seibt also describes herself as a "climate realist" and has denied allegations that she is a "puppet of the right wing or the climate deniers or the Heartland Institute".

Early life 
In a 19 February 2020 interview with Die Weltwoche, Seibt stated that she became interested in politics when she started to attend political events with her mother in 2015. At the time, she was critical of the Christian Democratic Union of Germany (CDU). Seibt lives in Münster, North Rhine-Westphalia, with her sister and their mother, a lawyer who has represented politicians from the right-wing populist Alternative für Deutschland (AfD) party.

In September 2017, Seibt graduated from Gymnasium St. Mauritz Bischöfl, a Catholic high school. She achieved a first place in physics in local regional competition of the Jugend forscht junior division, called "Students Experiment", and second place in mathematics.

Career 
When Seibt was 16, her poem on nationalism, "Sometimes I Keep Silent", was published on David Berger's "anti-Islamisation" blog Philosophia Perennis, as part of an AfD competition.

Since May 2019, Seibt has recorded YouTube videos using her mobile phone on topics ranging from migration to feminism to climate change, in which she calls herself a "climate realist".

On 4 November 2019, the Süddeutsche Zeitung, one of Germany's largest daily newspapers, spoke of her appearance at the end of the European Institute for Climate and Energy's (EIKE)  annual "International Climate and Energy Conference" held in Munich on 2 November, saying, "They have their own Greta. A climate change denier Greta." In her speech, Seibt said that before she started questioning a lot of things, like feminism and "cultural socialism", she too was a "climate alarmist" (translated from German).

On 3 December 2019, Seibt spoke as an invited guest at the Madrid "Climate Reality Forum", a forum organized to rebut the United Nations' climate change warnings, while Greta Thunberg spoke at the 2019 United Nations Climate Change Conference (COP25) several miles away. In 2019, Germany's AfD had embraced climate change denial as part of their political campaign in Europe, and were therefore, also aligned with EIKE. She was the only woman invited to speak at an event that is "traditionally dominated by older men".

Seibt has previously spoken at The Heartland Institute and at the Conservative Political Action Conference (CPAC) in Maryland, Seibt spoke to about a hundred conservatives. Seibt has denied allegations that she is a "puppet of the right wing or the climate deniers or the Heartland Institute".

On 28 February 2020, an article in The Guardian stated that Seibt was inspired by the Canadian alt-right, white nationalist and conspiracy theorist Stefan Molyneux after being introduced to his blogs. She has been accused of both antisemitism and white nationalism due to her support for some on the alt-right. Seibt refused to comment, but her mother denied that her daughter supports far-right politics.

In April 2020, Seibt said her formal work with The Heartland Institute had come to an end. She said that it was her decision not to renew a contract, and it was made because the Landesanstalt für Medien NRW threatened to delete her YouTube channel on the grounds that she wants to influence German politics for an American think-tank.

In November 2020, she falsely claimed that COVID-19 had not yet been isolated and the PCR testing procedure (to detect the presence of the virus) was unreliable; she falsely claimed it was only based on a computer model of the virus genome.

In October 2021, Seibt claimed in an interview with SVT that young climate activists do not have enough knowledge on climate issues to be public speakers about the issue and that they have been scared into being exploited by those in power.

Public image 
Seibt has aligned herself as a paid conservative blogger who is being promoted as "Anti-Greta", in response to Greta Thunberg, aligning herself with the Alternative for Germany. This image has been further propagated by The Heartland Institute, who compares her to Greta in promotional anti-climate change campaigns. Seibt self-identifies as Libertarian.

A 2020 joint investigation by Correctiv and Frontal21 revealed that The Heartland Institute's James Taylor considered Seibt to be the star of their "media strategy for the masses" in their "fight against climate protection measures" which "needs a better image"—to "move away from old white men and instead showcase a younger generation."

The Neue Zürcher Zeitung (NZZ) described Seibt as a "right-wing Youtuber" who "attacks climate science in her videos". The Guardian described her as a "so-called 'YouTube influencer" who tells her followers that Thunberg and other activists are whipping up unnecessary hysteria by exaggerating the climate crisis".

In an interview with The Washington Post, Graham Brookie, the director of the Atlantic Council's Digital Forensic Research Lab, commented on Seibt's approach to Thunberg's message on climate, in which she counters Thunberg's "I want you to panic" by saying in a video posted on Heartland's website that "I don't want you to panic. I want you to think". Brookie said in an email: "While it is not outright disinformation,[...] it does bear resemblance to a model we use called the 4d's — dismiss the message, distort the facts, distract the audience, and express dismay at the whole thing. The tactic is intended to create an equivalency in spokespeople and message. In this case, it is a false equivalency between a message based in climate science that went viral organically and a message based in climate skepticism trying to catch up using paid promotion".

YouTube ban 
In May 2021 a tweet by YouTube confirmed its final ban on her channel on April 30, 2021, for violating the YouTube Community Guidelines on Misinformation and Harassment.

Notes

References

External links 
 

2000 births
Living people
21st-century German women
Alt-right
German YouTubers
People from Münster
Anarcho-capitalists
German conspiracy theorists
German anti-vaccination activists
COVID-19 conspiracy theorists